Back to School is a French comedy film written and directed by Remy Four and Julien War. The plot revolves around two friends at their middle school reunion, eager to make an impression on old bullies and crushes.

The film was released on August 30, 2019 on Netflix.

Cast
 Jérôme Niel
 Ludovik Day
 Nicolas Berno

Release
Back to School was released on August 30, 2019 on Netflix.

References

External links
 
 

2019 films
2010s French-language films
French-language Netflix original films
French comedy films
2019 comedy films
2010s French films